Chimney Cove is an abandoned community in Newfoundland and Labrador located to the south of Cape St. Gregory.

Ghost towns in Newfoundland and Labrador